The 2007 MLS Cup Playoffs was the postseason to Major League Soccer's 2007 season, and it concluded with MLS Cup 2007 on November 18, 2007 at Robert F. Kennedy Memorial Stadium in Washington, D.C. The Houston Dynamo were victorious for the second season in a row, defeating the New England Revolution in the Final, also for the second year in a row.

Format

At season's end, the top two teams of each conference made the playoffs, along with the teams with the next four highest point totals, regardless of conference. In the first round of this knockout tournament, aggregate goals over two matches determined the winners; the Conference Championships were one match each, with the winner of each conference advancing to MLS Cup.  In all rounds, draws were broken with two 15-minute periods of extra time, followed by penalty kicks if necessary. The away goals rule was not used.

Standings

Conference standings

 - Toronto FC cannot qualify for the U.S. Open Cup, as it is a Canadian-based team.If they had qualified for an automatic berth into the U.S. Open Cup, the next highest placed team in the Eastern Conference not already qualified would have qualified.

Overall standings

 - Toronto FC cannot qualify for the CONCACAF Champions League through MLS.  Rather, they can qualify through the Canadian Championship.If they had qualified for the Champions League through MLS, then the highest placed team not already qualified would have qualified.

 - Additional Champions League berths were awarded to the winner (Houston) and runner-up (New England) of MLS Cup 2007.The winner of the 2007 U.S. Open Cup (New England) also qualified.Because New England qualified twice, an additional berth was awarded to the 2007 MLS Supporters' Shield runner-up (Chivas USA).

Bracket

1 The Kansas City Wizards earned the eighth and final playoff berth, despite finishing fifth in the Eastern Conference.  They represent the fourth seed in the Western Conference playoff bracket, as only three teams in the Western Conference qualified for the playoffs.

Conference semifinals

Conference finals

Final

External links
 Official website of Major League Soccer
 Official website of the 2007 MLS Cup Playoffs

MLS Cup Playoffs